American Regiment may refer to:

King's Royal Rifle Corps, British regiment known as the "American Regiment" when originally formed in North America
3rd Infantry Regiment, US Army regiment first organized as the 1st American Regiment